Hōji is a romaji which can refer to:
Hōji (era), a Japanese era name
Hōji (Buddhism), a periodical Buddhist memorial service on behalf of a deceased person